The International Environmental Design Contest (IEDC)  is a competition hosted by the WERC Consortium and the Institute for Energy & the Environment at New Mexico State University. It is an annual event in which student teams prepare written, oral, poster, and bench-scale model presentations in response to design tasks. The student solutions are judged by industry and academic professionals.

Description 

The International Environmental Design Contest has been held annually at New Mexico State University in Las Cruces since 1991. The Contest occurs in April and draws college students from around the United States and the world. In the past, the contest has also held concurrent high school design contests.

In response to design tasks posed by the hosting organization, student teams prepare written, oral, poster, and bench-scale model presentations. The design tasks are "based on real-world environmental challenges" and usually relate to water and renewable energy. The challenges are developed with assistance from government agencies, industrial affiliates, and academic partners. These assisting entities also serve as judges for the final competition. Judging criteria includes: process feasibility and practicality, cost analysis, community relations and outreach, adherence to various applicable regulations and permitting, safety considerations, and a discussion of potential waste streams.

Students consider alternative solutions to a given “environmental challenge” from all aspects including technical, legal, health, socioeconomic and community related issues. Other considerations include regulatory guidelines, public opinion, and cost. Winning solutions merit cash prizes and traveling trophies.

The Contest is hosted by the Institute for Energy & the Environment at New Mexico State University. The Institute for Energy & the Environment includes: WERC, a Consortium for Environmental Education and Technology Development, Southwest Technology Development Institute, a renewable energy research and development group, and Carlsbad Environmental Monitoring and Research Center, a nuclear waste-management and monitoring center.

The contest is a sponsored event. In 2007, it was sponsored by Intel, the U.S. Department of Energy, the U.S. Food and Drug Administration and the American Water Works Association and Research Foundation. In 2011, the State of New Mexico, Freeport-McMoRan Copper & Gold, Intel Corporation, the Office of Naval Research, the U.S. Bureau of Reclamation, and the U.S. Food and Drug Administration acted as sponsors for the event.

Tasks
In 2003, there were 14 tasks. In 2011, there were seven. Tasks require students "to present design proposals, oral and poster presentations, and working bench-scale models to verify the design, functionality, and cost-effectiveness of their proposed solutions." The tasks are developed from input given by government agencies, industrial affiliates, academic partners to the Institute for Energy and the Environment.

Example Design Contest tasks from 2007:

 Develop a photovoltaic (solar panel) system performance indicator to determine that a residential utility-interactive PV system is operating properly and that the AC power output is following the solar power available to the PV array.
 Develop an inland desalination operation and disposal system for water)in rural, isolated communities to demonstrate a low-cost, simple and reliable system.
 Convert a biomass resource to useful forms of energy and other products to demonstrate options using biogas or liquids.''

Awards
Cash prizes and traveling trophies are awarded at the Design Contest. Individual awards are also distributed at the event. Awards include Outstanding Award for best oral and paper presentation, the Terry McManus Award, the Intel Innovation award, and first and second place for the various tasks. The following is a listing of Design Contest Awards and their recipients at previous years' competitions:

2014 Design Contest Awards

2011 Design Contest Awards

1991 Design Contest Awards

Participating Teams
More than 5000 students have participated in the contest since its beginning. As of 2011, the following universities have attended the International Environmental Design Contest:

 Albuquerque Technical Vocational Institute	
 Arizona State University	
 California State University, Fullerton	
 California State Polytechnic University Pomona
 California State Polytechnic University, San Luis Obispo
 Calvin College	
 Case Western Reserve University
 Clarkson University	
 Clemson University	
 Cleveland State University	
 College of Santa Fe	
 Colorado School of Mines	
 Colorado State University	
 Cornell University	
 Dalhousie University	
 Diné College	
 Florida International University	
 Louisiana State University	
 Lafayette College	
 Manhattan College
 Massachusetts Institute of Technology	
 Mesa State College	
 Institute of Technology
 Michigan State University	
 Michigan Technological University	
 Mississippi State University	
 Montana Tech of the University of Montana	
 New Mexico Institute of Mining and Technology	
 New Mexico State University	
 Mexico State University, Carlsbad	

 Northern Arizona University	
 North Carolina State University	
 Northeastern University	
 Ohio State University	
 Ohio University	
 Oklahoma State University
 Oregon State University
 Pennsylvania State University
 Purdue University
 Santa Clara University
 South Dakota School of Mines and Technology
 Stanford University	
 State University of New York
 Texas Tech University
 Tufts University
 University of Akron
 University of Alabama, Huntsville
 University of Alaska, Fairbanks
 University of Arkansas
 University of California, Riverside
 University of Colorado, Boulder
 University of Houston
 University of Idaho
 University of Illinois, Chicago
 University of Maryland
 University of Minnesota, Duluth
 University of Mississippi
 University of Missouri
 University of Nevada, Reno
 University of New Hampshire

 University of New Mexico
 University of Oklahoma
 University of Texas, San Antonio
 University of Tulsa
 University of Georgia
 University of Washington
 University of Wyoming
 Villanova University
 Washington State University, Tri-Cities
 Wayne State University
 Western New England College
 West Virginia University
 Widener University
 Worcester Polytechnic Institute

International Schools	
 Boğaziçi University, Turkey
 Budapest Technical University, Hungary
 Dalhousie University, Canada
 Thadomal Shahani Engineering College, India
 United Arab Emirates University, UAE
 Universidad de las Américas, Mexico
 University of Manitoba, Canada
 University of Waterloo, Canada

References

External links 
 International Environmental Design Contest (IEDC)
 WERC Design Contest
 Institute for Energy & the Environment Design Contest Page
 Ohio University/WERC Website

Environmental design
Competitions